The Estadio Miguel Castro Servín is a multi-use stadium in Hermosillo, Sonora.  It is currently used mostly for football matches and is the home stadium for Cimarrones de Sonora Premier  The stadium has a capacity of 4,000 people.

References

External links

Estadio Miguel Castro Servín
Athletics (track and field) venues in Mexico
Sports venues in Sonora
Hermosillo